The 7th TCA Awards were presented by the Television Critics Association. The ceremony was held on July 26, 1991, at the Universal City Hilton in Los Angeles, Calif.

Winners and nominees

Multiple wins 
The following shows received multiple wins:

Multiple nominations 
The following shows received multiple nominations:

References

External links
Official website
1991 TCA Awards at IMDb.com

1991 television awards
1991 in American television
TCA Awards ceremonies